Grady Baxter Wilson (1919–1987) was an American evangelist. He was a childhood friend, and later a close associate of Billy Graham, serving as the inaugural vice president of the Billy Graham Evangelistic Association. Like Graham, Wilson was converted in 1934 under the preaching of Mordecai Ham.

In 1978, he suffered a heart attack that led to a quadruple bypass; he died of congestive heart failure on October 30, 1987 in Charlotte, North Carolina.

External links 

 Archived Records of Grady B. Wilson, 1950-1987, Wheaton College - Buswell Library
 Billy Graham Library: Grady and T.W. Wilson Archives

References 

1919 births
1987 deaths
American evangelists
Bob Jones University alumni
Wheaton College (Illinois) alumni
20th-century Baptist ministers from the United States